The Madurai Diraviyam Thayumanavar Hindu College, also known as The M.D.T. Hindu College, is one of the oldest general degree college located in Tirunelveli, Tamil Nadu. It was established in the year 1879. The college is affiliated with Manonmaniam Sundaranar University. This college offers different courses in arts, commerce and science.

Departments

Science
Physics
Chemistry
Mathematics
Computer Science
Zoology

Arts and Commerce
Tamil
English
Economics
History
Physical Education
Library Science
Commerce

Accreditation
The college is  recognized by the University Grants Commission (UGC).

Notable alumni
 Nainar Nagendran, Politician, Member of Legislative Assembly - Government of Tamilnadu

 Subramania Bharati, Journalist, poet, writer, teacher, patriot, freedom fighter

 P. Sri Acharya, Journalist, Writer, Scholar, Independence Activist

References

External links
http://www.mdthinducollegetirunelveli.org

Educational institutions established in 1879
1879 establishments in India
Colleges affiliated to Manonmaniam Sundaranar University
Universities and colleges in Tirunelveli district
Academic institutions formerly affiliated with the University of Madras